Southern Nights is a 1975 R&B concept album by Allen Toussaint. Seminal to the development of New Orleans R&B, Toussaint incorporated into the album elements of funk and soul music, while, according to AllMusic, suggesting neo-psychedelia. Two singles were released in support of the album, "Country John" backed with "When the Party's Over" and "Southern Nights"—Toussaint's signature song—backed with "Out of the City". Although neither single charted for Toussaint, "Southern Nights" as later covered by Glen Campbell in 1977 reached number one in Billboards country, pop and adult contemporary charts. Released in May 1975 by Reprise Records, the album has been subsequently reissued multiple times on both LP and CD.

Songs
Among the better known songs of the album, "Southern Nights" was Toussaint's tribute to evenings spent with his Creole family on a porch in the songwriter's native Louisiana. The song that would become Toussaint's signature song was brought to the attention of Glen Campbell by Campbell-collaborator Jimmy Webb. Campbell released it on an album he titled Southern Nights in February 1977, whereupon it spent four weeks at the top of the country, pop and adult contemporary charts. Toussaint's version of the song was very different from the "cheerful catchiness and...bright, colorful feel" of Campbell's; AllMusic comments in its album review on the "swirling, trippy arrangement that plays like a heat mirage" of Toussaint's version, while The Times-Picayune remarked in 2009 on its "strange psychedelic-swamp-water sound." In 1994, Toussaint came out of a lengthy hiatus as a performer to record the song in duet with Chet Atkins for the compilation album Rhythm, Country and Blues. Toussaint frequently performed the song in concert.

Bonnie Raitt also had success with her cover of "What Do You Want the Girl to Do", retitled "What Do You Want the Boy to Do?" and released on 1975's Home Plate.

Reception

According to 2002's Louisiana Music, the album is regarded as "perhaps...[Toussaint's] signature record"; in 1994, Toussaint himself characterized the album as his best. Although overall a critical success, it was not financially successful and was not universally well received. AllMusic indicates the album should be "part of any serious soul collection", but notes that a few average songs and repetitive instrumental fillers "prevents Southern Nights from being a full-fledged masterpiece".

Track listing
All tracks composed by Allen Toussaint.
"Last Train" – 3:01
"Worldwide" – 2:42
"Back in Baby's Arms" – 4:49
"Country John" – 4:45
"Basic Lady" – 2:58
"Southern Nights" – 3:36
"You Will Not Lose" – 3:42
"What Do You Want the Girl to Do?" – 3:40
"When the Party's Over" – 2:38
"Cruel Way to Go Down" – 3:52

Personnel

Performers
Carl Blouin – baritone saxophone
Gary Brown – tenor saxophone
Lester Caliste – trombone
Joan Harmon – backing vocals
Steve Howard – trumpet
Claude Kerr, Jr. – trumpet, flugelhorn
Ziggy Modeliste – drums
Charles Victor Moore – guitar
Jim Moore – flute, tenor saxophone
Sharon Nabonne – backing vocals
Arthur "Red" Neville – organ
Leo Nocentelli – guitar
Deborah Paul – backing vocals
George Porter Jr. – bass guitar
Lon Price – flute, alto saxophone, tenor saxophone
Alfred "Uganda" Roberts – conga
Teddy Royal – guitar
Allen Toussaint – guitar, harmonica, piano, keyboards, vocals
Clyde Williams – drums

Production
Greg Burgess – liner notes
Roberta Grace – engineer
Gary Hobish – reissue mastering
Ken Laxton – engineer
Bob Merlis – photography
Patrick Roques – reissue art direction, reissue design
Filippo Salvadori – reissue producer
Marshall Sehorn – producer
George Stavrinos – cover illustration
Ed Thrasher – art direction
Allen Toussaint – arranger, producer

Release history

References

Allen Toussaint albums
1975 albums
Albums produced by Allen Toussaint
Reprise Records albums